Sphenophryne schlaginhaufeni is a species of frog in the family Microhylidae.
It is found in New Guinea.

Its natural habitats are subtropical or tropical moist lowland forests and subtropical or tropical moist montane forests. 

As part of its mating habits, the male excretes a hormone on an unsuspecting female, rendering it unconscious before copulation.

References

Sphenophryne
Amphibians of New Guinea
Taxonomy articles created by Polbot
Amphibians described in 1911